Boca Dam  (National ID No. CA10135) is an earthfill dam and a part of the Truckee Storage Project that encompasses Nevada County, California and Washoe County, Nevada in the United States.

Boca Dam's area of significance includes agriculture, conservation, and engineering. It is administered by the U.S. Department of the Interior, Bureau of Reclamation, and operated by the Washoe County Water Conservation District. The technical point of contact is the United States District Court Water Master's Office in Reno. The dam's major period of significance was 1925 through 1949.

Dimensions

 Crest elevation: 
 Structural height: 
 Crest length: 
 Top of joint use: 
 Top of active conservation: 
 Top of inactive conservation: N/A
 Spillway crest: 
 Top of dead storage: 
 Streambed at dam axis:

Landmark
The dam is registered in the National Register of Historic Places.  Its commemorative plaque states:
Boca Dam 1937 - 1940

United States Department of the Interior
Harold L. Ickes...Secretary

Bureau of Reclamation
John C. Page...Commissioner
R. F. Walter...Chief Engineer
L. J. Foster and C. S. Hale Construction Engineers

Heigh..............116 Feet
Length..............1629 Feet
Storage Capacity....40,901 Acre-Feet
Contractor..........George W. Condon Co.

See also
List of dams and reservoirs in California

References

External links
 Boca Dam at Noehill Travels in California

Dams in California
Buildings and structures in Nevada County, California
Dams completed in 1939
Dams on the National Register of Historic Places in California
National Register of Historic Places in Nevada County, California
United States Bureau of Reclamation dams